The Meters is the debut album by the American funk group The Meters. It was released in May 1969, the first of eight albums by the band. The band's early works were developed through improvisation. Band members had spent most of the 1960s performing together in nightclubs of New Orleans. They had a fluid musical style that included elements of R&B, rock, and jazz.

Background
The first track, "Cissy Strut," was the band's opening song during their residency at the Ivanhoe nightclub in late 1960s. The original melody was introduced by Leo Nocentelli. The song was not yet titled, and the band's name was Art Neville and the Neville Sounds. The song was recorded at the Cosimo Studios. It was first released as a single and sold 200,000 copies in two weeks. Its commercial success became an impetus for the band's name change and subsequent recording career.

The variety of instruments on the album's cover symbolizes the diversity of compositions and rhythms. Its back cover depicts the band members in the early phase of their career. Many of the band's early instrumental tracks were named only after they were recorded. The album's eighth track was named for the 6V6 vacuum tube, which is commonly used in guitar amplifiers.

Reception

A review by AllMusic noted the music's simplicity and nuance and called it "impressive". Tamara Davidson of Revive Music had a positive review and wrote "the album is filled with infectious grooves, filthy bass lines, and revolutionary drum rhythms." According to Brian Knight of The Vermont Review, the album "set the pace for both the Meters and the entire New Orleans funk sound."

Jeff Chang described the band in relation to the cultural backdrop of the 1960s, their influences, and their influence on music. He wrote: "Modeliste once described the songs as 'soundbites,' as 'entries of different grooves and different ideas about groove.' Indeed, they could fill a jam-band encyclopedia, hundreds of little ideas that could each be stretched out like twenty-minute rubber bands."

Track listing

 Listed as "Sehorns Farm" on original LP release; and "Sehorns Farms" on original 45rpm single.

Personnel
Credits adapted from AllMusic.
The Meters
Art Neville – organ, keyboards
Ziggy Modeliste – drums
Leo Nocentelli – guitar
George Porter Jr. – bass guitar
Production
Allen Toussaint – producer
Marshall Sehorn – producer
Giovanni Scatola – remastering
Janie Gans – art supervisor
Jake Kennedy – liner notes

Charts

Weekly charts

Singles

Further reading

References

1969 debut albums
The Meters albums
Albums produced by Allen Toussaint
Josie Records albums